One Day in Your Life is a compilation released by Michael Jackson's former record label Motown Records, consisting of both solo and Jackson 5 tracks recorded with Motown, and released on March 25, 1981. It was the first Jackson album released in the 1980s. Most of the tracks are from Jackson's fourth studio album, Forever, Michael (1975). The other songs were taken from Jackson 5 releases to pad the album's running time. Motown later admitted that the album was just a quick cash grab generated from the success of Jackson's Off the Wall (1979).

The compilation's title track (originally appearing as a non-single track in Forever, Michael) was released as a single and became a worldwide hit, especially in the United Kingdom, where it became Jackson's first number-one hit as a solo artist.

Track listing
Tracks listed according to Discogs.

Charts

Weekly charts

References

Michael Jackson compilation albums
1981 compilation albums
Motown compilation albums